On September 7, 2022, three people were killed and three others were injured after a gunman went on a shooting spree in Memphis, Tennessee, United States. The attack was livestreamed on Facebook Live.

Shootings
The shootings began at around 12:56 a.m., when a man was found fatally shot on Lyndale Avenue. At 4:38 p.m., another man was found fatally shot on South Parkway East. Video surveillance showed that the gunman had fired multiple shots. Two minutes later, a woman with multiple gunshots to the leg was found at the intersection of Norris Road and Interstate 240. The gunman fled in a sedan eastbound on Norris Road.

At 5:59 p.m., a man was found in critical condition outside of an AutoZone on Jackson Avenue with multiple bullets wounds to the chest. At around the same time, the suspect, 19-year-old Ezekiel Kelly, posted a livestream on Facebook Live in which he reportedly entered an AutoZone, shot a man, and exited.

At 6:12 p.m., police received a tip that Kelly was on Facebook Live claiming that he would harm civilians. They subsequently launched a manhunt for Kelly and ordered a shelter-in-place. At 7:23 p.m., the gunman shot a woman on Poplar Avenue and took her SUV. A minute later, a man was found shot and injured further down the same street.

At 8:56 p.m., the gunman carjacked a woman driving a Dodge Challenger on Highway 51. Two minutes later, police located the vehicle northbound on Interstate 55 and arrested Kelly.

Police later stated that a 17-year-old girl initially believed to have been killed in the shootings was killed by another suspect.

Accused
Ezekiel Kelly, a 19-year-old male (born October 14, 2002), was previously convicted of a felony. Shortly before he was arrested, Kelly suffered injuries after allegedly crashing a stolen vehicle in Whitehaven. He has been charged with first degree murder. Additional charges were also filed including two additional counts of first-degree murder, along with terrorism and carjacking.

See also
 Gun violence in the United States
 2022 Detroit shootings

References

2022 active shooter incidents in the United States
2022 in Tennessee
2020s crimes in Tennessee
September 2022 crimes in the United States
Spree shootings in the United States
Livestreamed crimes
History of Memphis, Tennessee